Vignoles is a surname, and may refer to:

 Anna Vignoles, British educationalist
 Charles Blacker Vignoles (1793–1875), British railway engineer
 Charles Vignoles (priest) (1789–1877), Irish Anglican dean
 Étienne de Vignolles, known as La Hire, French soldier of the Hundred Years' War
 Roger Vignoles (born 1945), British pianist